The twenty-ninth edition of the Caribbean Series (Serie del Caribe) was played in . It was held from February 3 through February 8 with the champions teams from the Dominican Republic, Águilas Cibaeñas; Mexico, Venados de Mazatlán; Puerto Rico, Criollos de Caguas, and Venezuela, Leones del Caracas. The format consisted of 12 games, each team facing the other teams twice. The games were played at Héctor Espino Baseball Stadium in Hermosillo, Mexico.

Summary

Game 10
Venezuela  0
México     4
Dominicañ Reuble   1
Rico Rico          4

Final standings

Individual leaders

All-Star Team

See also
Ballplayers who have played in the Series

Sources
 Nuñez, José Antero (1994). Serie del Caribe de la Habana a Puerto La Cruz. JAN Editor.

External links
1-800-Beisbol.com : Serie del Caribe 1987, Hermosillo, Mexico (Spanish)

 

Caribbean
1987
International baseball competitions hosted by Mexico
1987 in Mexican sports
1987 in Caribbean sport
February 1987 sports events in Mexico